Rituraj Singh (born 23 May 1964) is an Indian television actor. He has played his different roles in a number of Indian TV shows like Banegi Apni Baat aired on Zee TV in 1993, Jyoti, Hitler Didi, Shapath, Warrior High, Aahat, and Adaalat, Diya Aur Baati Hum. He is also famous for the role of Balwant Chodhary  in the Colors TV serial Laado 2.

Personal Life
Rituraj Singh's full name is Rituraj Singh Chandrawat Sisodia. He was born in Kota, Rajasthan to a Sisodia Rajput family. Even though a native of Rajasthan, he did not properly live in Rajasthan. Singh did his schooling in Delhi. During his young age, he moved to the United States, before returning back to India at the age of 12. He moved and settled in Mumbai in 1993.

Career
Singh has worked in theatre in Delhi along with Barry John's Theatre Action Group (TAG) for 12 years and has been featured in the popular Hindi TV game show, Tol Mol Ke Bol, broadcast on Zee TV. Rituraj Singh is now part of a web series titled 'Abhay' which will be available on Zee5. This web series also marks the digital debut of Kunal Khemu.

Filmography

Films

Web series

Television series

References

External links

 

1964 births
Living people
20th-century Indian male actors
Rajasthani people
Actors from Rajasthan
Indian male film actors
21st-century Indian male actors
Indian male television actors